Baltidrilus is a genus of annelids belonging to the family Naididae.

The species of this genus are found in Estonia.

Species:
 Baltidrilus costatus (Claparéde, 1863)

References

Naididae